Pylaiella (mung) is a genus of seaweed (brown algae) that can be a nuisance due to its ability to coat people, ropes, animals, and more when it blooms close to the shore under particular conditions.

Species
Pylaiella aquitanica Ruprecht, 1850
Pylaiella gardneri Collins, 1912
Pylaiella hooperi De Toni, 1895
Pylaiella littoralis (Linnaeus) Kjellman, 1872
Pylaiella nana Kjellman, 1883
Pylaiella penicilliformis Kjellman, 1906
Pylaiella petaloniae Noda, 1975
Pylaiella seriata Kuckuck, 2007
Pylaiella tenella Setchell & N.L.Gardner, 1922
Pylaiella unilateralis Setchell & N.L.Gardner, 1922
Pylaiella varia Kjellman, 1883
Pylaiella washingtoniensis C.C.Jao, 1937

References

Further reading

External links
 DeCew's Guide
 GBIF's Biodiversity Data Portal instead puts brown algae in Kingdom Chromista
 Cape Codder: We call it mung

Ectocarpales
Brown algae genera